Brad Miller or Bradley Miller may refer to:
Brad Miller (baseball) (born 1989), American baseball player
Brad Miller (basketball) (born 1976), American basketball player
Brad Miller (politician) (born 1953), American politician and attorney
Brad Miller (footballer) (born 1983), Australian rules footballer
Brad Miller (ice hockey) (born 1969), Canadian ice hockey player
Brad Miller (chef) (born 1981), American chef and television personality
 Bradley W. Miller, Canadian jurist